The Lansing Public School District is the urban public school district covering 52 square miles including most of the city of Lansing, Michigan, part of the city of East Lansing, and parts of the townships of Delta, DeWitt, Lansing, and Watertown. It has specialty schools for Chinese Immersion, International Baccalaureate, STEM, STEAM, and other categories.

History
Public school in Lansing began in May 1847.  Between 1847 and 1851, three separate school districts were created within the three wards of the then-small city.  In March 1861 the number of wards was increased to four and the districts were consolidated into a single all-inclusive school district within the city limits as required by the new city charter.

In 1966 the district began a trial basis racial desegregation program. The district began desegregation busing at the elementary level in 1972. The vote to enact the desegregation plan was 5-3.

Boundary
Most of the district is in Ingham County. There, the district includes most of the county's portion of Lansing, as well as portions of East Lansing, Lansing Charter Township, and Delhi Charter Township.

A portion of the district is in Clinton County, where it serves portions of the parts of Lansing and East Lansing in the county, as well as sections of DeWitt Charter Township and Watertown Charter Township.

A portion of the district is in Eaton County, where it serves portions of the parts of Lansing in the county, as well as sections of Delta Charter Township and Windsor Charter Township.

Schools
 High schools
 Eastern High School
 Everett High School
 J. W. Sexton High School

 K-8 schools
 Gardner School
 Post Oak School
 Dwight Rich School of the Arts

 K-7 schools
 Lewton School
 Pattengill School

 4-7 schools
 Attwood School
 Mt. Hope School
 North School
 Sheridan Road School

 PreK-3 schools
 Averill New Tech
 Cavanagh
 Cumberland
 Forest View
 Gier Park
 Kendon
 Lyons
 Reo
 Riddle
 Wexford Montessori
 Willow

References

External links
 Lansing School District

School districts in Michigan
Education in Lansing, Michigan
Education in Ingham County, Michigan
Education in Clinton County, Michigan
1861 establishments in Michigan
School districts established in 1861